Gubernatorial elections took place in 20 out of the 21 new provinces of the Democratic Republic of the Congo on 26 March 2016 (in Sud-Ubangi the election did not occur until April 1, while in Nord-Ubangi a second round had to be held as no candidate received the majority). The elections were the first to take place since the Congolese government has fragmented the former 11 provinces into 26 as mandated by the DRC constitution, though by the time elections occurred only 21 provinces had completed the reform process. In most of the provinces, the elected governors are members or affiliates of the Alliance of the Presidential Majority.

Initially, the Constitutional Court ruled that President Joseph Kabila could appointed interim governors. They went on to organize elections in their regions. The Congolese opposition largely boycotted the elections or were excluded from them.

Governors are elected by provincial assemblies.

Results by province
List of the governors-elect by province.

References

2016
2016 elections in Africa
2016 in the Democratic Republic of the Congo
March 2016 events in Africa